Huntingdon is a market town in Cambridgeshire, England.

Huntingdon may also refer to:

Places

Canada
Huntingdon, Abbotsford, a community in British Columbia on the US border
Huntingdon, Quebec, a town
Huntingdon (electoral district), a federal electoral district
Huntingdon (Quebec provincial electoral district)

New Zealand
Huntingdon, New Zealand, a lightly populated locality

United Kingdom
Huntingdon (UK Parliament constituency)
Huntingdon Road in Cambridge, England

United States
Huntingdon County, Pennsylvania
Huntingdon, Pennsylvania, a borough and the county seat
Huntingdon, Tennessee, a town

People
Henry of Huntingdon, 12th-century historian and archbishop
Huntingdon Beaumont (c.1560–1624), English coalmining entrepreneur
John Huntingdon (preacher) (fl. 16th century), English preacher
Selina Hastings, Countess of Huntingdon, (1707–91), religious leader, founder of Countess of Huntingdon's Connexion
Terry Huntingdon (born 1940), American beauty pageant titleholder

Other
Earl of Huntingdon, a title in the Peerage of England
The Huntingdon, a skyscraper in Houston, Texas
Huntingdon (Boyce, Virginia), a plantation home listed on the National Register of Historic Places
Huntingdon (Roanoke, Virginia), a plantation home listed on the National Register of Historic Places
Huntingdon station (disambiguation), stations of the name
Huntingdon College, a liberal-arts college located in Montgomery, Alabama, United States of America
Huntingdon Plantation, Elmore County, Elmore, AL, USA. Home of Gen John Archer Elmore and Nancy Ann Martin Elmore. Gen Elmore was present at Yorktown, VA when Cornwallis surrendered to Gen George Washington ending the Revolutionary War. The existing home was built to replace an earlier version that burned soon after the Gen John Archer Elmore family arrived. Huntingdon Plantation is not open to the public. It has continuously been lovingly maintained by the descendants of Gen John Archer Elmore still living in Alabama.
Huntingdon Life Sciences (HLS), an animal-testing laboratory based in Huntingdon, England
Helen Graham (The Tenant of Wildfell Hall) (married name Huntingdon), the main female protagonist of Ann Bronte's novel The Tenant of Wildfell Hall; also Arthur Huntingdon and Arthur Huntingdon, Jr., her husband and their child respectively

See also

Huntington (disambiguation)
Huntingtown (disambiguation)